Alcohol Change UK is a British charity and campaign group founded in 1984 whose aim is to reduce the harm caused by alcohol. It is best known for its flagship awareness programs Alcohol Awareness Week and Dry January.

History and organisation
Alcohol Concern was founded in 1984. In 2007 it became one of the 24 founding member organisations of Alcohol Health Alliance UK, a coalition of medical, charity and campaign organisations related to alcohol. In April 2017, Alcohol Concern merged with Alcohol Research UK, and in November 2018 the merged group was named Alcohol Change UK. It is now recognised as a national agency on alcohol misuse for the UK.

Since September 2017, the charity has been led by Chief Executive Officer Dr Richard Piper, previously of Roald Dahl's Marvellous Medicine Children's Charity. Fiyaz Mughal is chair of the trustees.

Activities

Annual campaigns

In May 2012, Alcohol Concern began promoting Dry January, a national campaign in the UK for people to give up drinking alcohol for the month of January each year. The first Dry January was in 2013. The idea came from Emily Robinson, who gave up alcohol for January 2011 in preparation for a half marathon and joined Alcohol Concern in January 2012 while abstaining again. Public Health England began promoting the campaign in December 2014. In its first year, 4,000 people signed up for Dry January and it has grown in popularity ever since with nearly 9 million people taking part in 2023.

What’s more, other countries are interested in bringing Dry January to their own populations with the Dry January campaign being licensed to take place in France, Switzerland, Norway, Germany, and the USA.

Alcohol Awareness Week is run and managed by Alcohol Change UK. Each year, Alcohol Change UK sets the date and theme for the upcoming campaign and shares free digital resources for people to take part. The campaign has moved from its previous spot in November and now takes place every July.

Services
Consultancy and training

Alcohol Change UK offers training and consultancy services for professionals working in healthcare, housing and homelessness, social care, academia, or the emergency services, as well as in the workplace, to improve their policies and practices in supporting people with their drinking. Its flagship Blue Light approach helps to better support people with the most serious and chronic alcohol problems, who often have multiple needs.

Research

Alcohol Change UK funds, commissions, and conducts research to strengthen the evidence base and improve the lives of those affected by alcohol harm.

Advocacy
Alcohol Change UK acts as the secretariat and public enquiry point for the All-Party Parliamentary Group (APPG) on Alcohol Harm, which exists to discuss alcohol-related issues and make related recommendations to government. The current chair of the group is Christian Wakeford MP.

Funding
Alcohol Change UK is an independent charity, with income from an investment fund, grants, donations from supporters, and charges for consultancy and training.

See also
 Alcoholism
 Action on Addiction

References

External links
 
 
 NHS Alcohol Support

Addiction organisations in the United Kingdom
Organizations established in 1984
Health charities in the United Kingdom
1984 establishments in the United Kingdom
Alcohol abuse in the United Kingdom